Brunão may refer to:

Brunão (footballer) (born 1997), Brazilian football centre-back
Brunão (stadium), Brazilian football stadium in Santo André, São Paulo